"The Devil Is a Lie" is a hip hop song by American rapper Rick Ross, featuring Jay-Z. It was released as the lead single from his sixth studio album, Mastermind on December 19, 2013. The song was produced by Major Seven and K.E. on the Track.

Background
On October 23, 2013, Rick Ross announced that the album's second single, which will feature Jay-Z, will be released in early November 2013. The following day, Ross revealed that the song is titled "The Devil Is A Lie". He explained that song saying, "We're pushing the envelope once again and it's just one of those records I can't wait to hit the streets. We went in another direction but it's just one of those records that's gonna speak for itself and everybody's gonna have their opinion of it, but it's most definitely what the streets need." On December 19, 2013, the song was released for digital download. It was sent to urban contemporary radio in the United States on January 21, 2014. Dan Rys of XXL called the instrumental "the most massive beat we've heard this year".

Music video 
The video for "The Devil Is A Lie" was released on March 20, 2014, and does not include Jay-Z's verse. An unofficial music video directed by Ashley Smith, has amassed a considerable view count on YouTube as well. This video in question has reached 20 million views, while the official has around 3 million as of March 2022. The video features 2 catholic priests lip syncing the entire song, rapping Ross and Jay-Z's respective verses.

Track listing

Chart performance

Certifications

Release history

References

2013 singles
Rick Ross songs
Jay-Z songs
Maybach Music Group singles
Def Jam Recordings singles
Songs written by Jay-Z
Songs written by Rick Ross
2013 songs
Song recordings produced by K.E. on the Track